Hruta Durgule (born 12 September 1990) is an Indian television and film actress. Widely known for portraying lead characters on Marathi-television, she is the recipient of several accolades including Sanskruti Kaladarpan & Maharashtra Times Sanmaan Awards  and has established herself as one of the most popular Marathi television actresses.

She made her television debut with Star Pravah's Durva (2013). She made her big-screen debut with Ananya the Marathi film.  She rose to prominence with her portrayal of Vaidehi in Zee Yuva's Phulpakharu.

In 2020, she hosted Sony Marathi's singing reality show Singing Star. She has also played the character of Deepika Deshpande in Zee Marathi's Man Udu Udu Zhala.

Early life 
Hruta Durgule was born on 12 September 1993. She is originally from Ratnagiri but brought up in Mumbai and completed education from Ramnarain Ruia College, Matunga, Mumbai. For now, she lives in Thane.

Personal life 
Hruta married TV and film director – Prateek Shah on 18 May 2022.

Career 
Durgule started her career with Pudhcha Paaul as an assistant director where she learnt that Rasika Deodhar (casting director) was searching new faces for her upcoming show & she auditioned for the titular role after which she was selected in Durva that aired on Star Pravah. In 2017, she starred in Phulpakharu , that aired on Zee Yuva, which lasted for about 2.5 years.  In 2018, She began playing  a role in drama Dada Ek Good News Ahey, alongside Umesh Kamat, Rishi Manohar and Aarti More. The play is produced by Priya Bapat. She played the character of Mrunmayee (aka Chiu) in Strawberry Shake. The short film was released on ZEE5 Premium amidst the COVID pandemic.

In 2020, she hosted the show Singing Star, which aired on Sony Marathi. Singing Star was her debut performance as a host.

Durgule debuted in the Marathi film industry with Ananya produced by Ravi Jadhav. The film released on 22 July, 2022. She is also a part of a new web series, alongside Suvrat Joshi, named Duet. Duet is yet to release.  She was also seen in Man Udu Udu Zhala, which aired on Zee Marathi from 2021–2022, portraying the role of Deepika Deshpande. She was also seen in the Marathi movie Timepass 3, which released on 29th July, 2022.

Media image
In 2019, she was described as the most attractive women of Marathi Television. She was ranked first in The Times of India'''s Top 15 most desirable women in Marathi television 2018 and she was ranked second in The Times of India'''s 2020. She is  one of the most popular Marathi television actresses. 

She is well known TV serial actress in Maharashtra and known as a " MaharashtraChi Crush " in marathi industry. She is first in Top 5 Marathi television actress in 2022.

Filmography

Films

Television

Stage

Web series

Special appearances

Awards and nominations

References

External links 
 
 
 

Living people
Actresses from Maharashtra
Indian soap opera actresses
Indian television actresses
21st-century Indian actresses
Actresses in Marathi television
1994 births
Actresses in Marathi cinema
Actresses in Marathi theatre